Skiotocharax meizon is a species of South American darter endemic to Guyana where it is found in the basins of the Mazaruni and Berbice Rivers.  It is the only member of its genus.

References
 

Crenuchidae

Fish of South America
Endemic fauna of Guyana
Taxa named by Stanley Howard Weitzman
Fish described in 2000